Ananda Karki (Nepali:आनन्द कार्की)  is a Nepali Singer of Nepal. He was born in  Solukhumbu District of Nepal  in 20th Jan.Karki started Ghazls Trend in Nepal. He sing  western music, Hindi music and whole lot of his own Nepali music.

About & Biography 
He has sung over 600 Hindi songs. Till Now Karki has sung more then three thousand songs in  Nepali as well as Hindi.

He has been won national and international honours from the late King Queen of Nepal to the prestigious Birendra Aishwarya padak, Gorkha dakshin , Zee t.v closeup sa re ga pa 1998 for best singer and so on. Karki has been acted in Nepali as will as Hindi serials as playback singer. He has been worked on more then 600 Nepali and Hindi movie's songs till Now. 'Jiwan ma Khola Tarnu chha' is the song of his musical carrier. 'Lagchha herirahu', 'janam janam jiula sangai','chup chap timi chhau','khabardar' and pheri aayo timro yaad are the some popular song in his musical carrier till now. He has been honored from differnt Organization.

References

Nepalese male singers
Year of birth missing (living people)
Living people
People from Solukhumbu District